The 2018 Apertura season served as the opening half of the 2017–18 Liga FPD season. It began on 6 January 2018 and, given the possibility of a final, will end on 20 May 2018.

Pérez Zeledón are the defending champions.

Personnel and kits

Managerial changes

League table

Regular season

Standings

Positions by round

Results

Quadrangular – Clausura

Season statistics

References

External links
 UNAFUT - Primera División de Costa Rica

2017–18 in Costa Rican football